The 2002 Villanova Wildcats football team was an American football team that represented the Villanova University in the Atlantic 10 Conference during the 2002 NCAA Division I-AA football season. In their 18th season under head coach Andy Talley, the Wildcats compiled an 11–4 record (7–1 against conference opponents), outscored opponents by a total of 448 to 278, and was ranked No. 4 in  The Sports Network I-AA Poll. The team advanced to the Division I-A playoffs, defeating Furman in the first round and Fordham in the quarterfinals, before losing to McNeese State in the semifinals. The Wildcats played their home games at Villanova Stadium in Villanova, Pennsylvania.

Schedule

References

Villanova
Villanova Wildcats football seasons
Villanova Wildcats football